These hits topped the Ultratop 50 in the Flanders region of Belgium in 1985.

See also
1985 in music

References

1985 in Belgium
1985 record charts
1985